Somebody Like Me may refer to:
 Somebody Like Me (album), a 1966 album by Eddy Arnold
 "Somebody Like Me" (Eddy Arnold song), 1966
 "Somebody Like Me" (Silkk the Shocker song), 1999
 "Somebody Like Me" (Samantha Mumba song), 2013